Francis "Frank" Corbett (born 1954) is a former Deputy Premier of Nova Scotia.

He represented the riding of Cape Breton Centre in the Nova Scotia House of Assembly from 1998 to 2015. He was a member of the Nova Scotia New Democratic Party.

Early life and career
Corbett was born and raised in New Waterford and currently resides in Lingan.  Corbett worked as a television cameraman for CJCB-TV, the CTV affiliate in Sydney and volunteered with the provincial NDP as well as the labour movement for over 25 years, primarily with the Communications, Energy, and Paperworkers Union. He served as official agent for Buddy MacEachern's successful elections in the 1974 and 1978 provincial elections.

Political career
Corbett ran for the NDP nomination in the riding of Cape Breton Centre and was first elected in the 1998 provincial election.  Corbett was subsequently re-elected in the 1999, 2003, 2006, 2009 and 2013 provincial elections.

Following the 2009 election, Corbett was appointed to the Executive Council of Nova Scotia as Deputy Premier, Minister of the Public Service Commission, and Minister of Communications Nova Scotia. In a March 2013 cabinet shuffle, Corbett was appointed Minister of Labour and Advanced Education, and Minister of Immigration. Along with his cabinet duties, Corbett also served as the Government House Leader.

On November 10, 2009, it was revealed that Corbett had the highest meal expense bills on file amongst cabinet members in the new NDP government. A check of ministers' records showed that Corbett expensed $441.48 for six people at the Keg restaurant in downtown Halifax on June 19, the night he and his 11 cabinet colleagues were sworn in.  In July Corbett expensed $332.90 at CUT Steakhouse in Halifax for a dinner meeting for three people.  Two nights later he expensed $250.28 at Ryan Duffy's in Halifax for three people.

These revelations came after a statement released in September 2009 in which Corbett stated that because of the province's projected $590-million deficit, MLAs and staff had to be prepared to "lead by example." When news of Corbett's meal expenses was made public, he was quoted as saying "I screwed up and it won't happen again".

On April 2, 2015, Corbett announced his resignation as MLA.

Personal life
He is married to Joan and they have two children.

References

1954 births
Canadian people of Irish descent
Living people
Nova Scotia New Democratic Party MLAs
People from New Waterford, Nova Scotia
Members of the Executive Council of Nova Scotia
Deputy premiers of Nova Scotia
21st-century Canadian politicians